Star of the Circus is a 1938 British drama film directed by Albert de Courville and starring Otto Kruger, Gertrude Michael and John Clements. It is a remake of the 1937 German circus film Truxa, itself based on a novel by Heinrich Seiler. It was made at Elstree Studios.

Cast
 Otto Kruger as Garvin  
 Gertrude Michael as Yester  
 John Clements as Paul Houston  
 Patrick Barr as Truxa  
 Barbara Blair as Hilda  
 Gene Sheldon as Peters  
 John Turnbull as Tenzler  
 Norah Howard as Frau Schlipp 
 Alfred Wellesley as Ackermann

References

Bibliography
 Low, Rachael. Filmmaking in 1930s Britain. George Allen & Unwin, 1985.
 Wood, Linda. British Films, 1927-1939. British Film Institute, 1986.

External links

1938 films
British drama films
British black-and-white films
1938 drama films
Films directed by Albert de Courville
Films shot at Associated British Studios
British remakes of German films
Circus films
1930s English-language films
1930s British films